, there were around 18,700 electric vehicles in Russia, equivalent to 0.04% of all cars in the country. , around 0.13% of new cars sold in Russia were electric.

Statistics
, the Volkswagen ID.4 was the best-selling electric car in Russia.

Government policy

Charging stations
, there were around 400 public charging stations in Russia.

Manufacturing
The first electric vehicle manufacturing plant in Russia, operated by Dongfeng Motor Corporation, opened in September 2022 in Lipetsk Oblast.

By federal subject

Moscow
, there were about 3,000 electric vehicles in Moscow.

References

 
Russia
Road transport in Russia